Francesco Accolti (c. 1416 – 1488), also called Francesco d'Arezzo, was an Italian jurist. The brother of Benedetto Accolti, he professed jurisprudence at Bologna from 1440 to 1445, and afterwards at Ferrara, Siena, and Pisa.

He possessed a strong understanding and powerful eloquence. The distinction which he acquired was so great, that he flattered himself with the expectation of obtaining a cardinal's hat, on the accession of Sixtus IV to the pontifical throne; and when it was refused him, the pope though it necessary to accompany the refusal with this complimentary apology: "I would gladly have granted you the honor, had I not feared, that your preferment, by removing you from your school, would have hindered the progress of science." The reputation of Accolti was tarnished by the parsimony with which he amassed vast treasures. He wrote several treatises on law, and translated some of the writings of Chrysostom.

See also
Accolti, other members of the family

References

External links
Francesco Accolti works at Somni
Francisci Aretini in Phalaridis tyranni agrigentini Epistolas, digitized manuscript.
Epistole di Phalari, digitized manuscript.

1416 births
1488 deaths
People from Arezzo
15th-century Italian jurists